Joachim André Garraud (born 27 September 1968) is a French DJ, remixer and record producer from Nantes.

He is a producer of artists such as Paul Johnson, Deep Dish, David Bowie, Orchestral Manoeuvres in the Dark (OMD), Kylie Minogue, Mylène Farmer, Cassius, Saffron Hill and Culture Club. Known for his many collaborations with other DJs and musicians such as Jean-Michel Jarre and David Guetta (with whom he co-founded the Gum Records label), he currently hosts a weekly show on Radio NWO called Zemixx also available as a podcast.

Biography
After having perfected his piano and percussion for seven years at the conservatory, he decided to move toward electronic music.
He started as a DJ at The Boy, the Parisian club that first initiated the discovery of the techno phenomenon in France. He then began producing music for Maxximum radio station.

Becoming the pioneer of numerical music, he created his own recording studio in the middle of Paris, which allowed him to remix, compose or produce artists such as David Guetta, Jean-Michel Jarre, Paul Johnson, Deep Dish, David Bowie, OMD, Kylie Minogue, Mylène Farmer, Cassius, Cerrone, Moby, Robbie Rivera. Nowadays, he is uses a Space Invader mascot to identify with his fan community.

Discography 
 2 September 2019 — Joachim Garraud — 3Acid3 (Rezone Remix)
 1 March 2019 — Joachim Garraud — Signal (EP)
 8 January 2018 — Joachim Garraud — Maximus  feat. A Girl And A Gun
 9 June 2017 — Joachim Garraud, Ridwello, Chris Willis — Beautiful
 22 January 2016 — Joachim Garraud — 96/24
 19 August 2014 Joachim Garraud, Chris Willis - One Life 
 30 May 2014 Joachim Garraud - Theory of Everything
 14 March 2014 Joachim Garraud, Perry & Etty Farrell - Everybody
 24 January 2008 — Kylie Minogue — Wow (David Guetta & Joachim Garraud Fuck Me I'm Famous Remix)
 26 January 2008 — Sharam - The One (David Guetta & Joachim Garraud Space Invaders Remix)
 1 July 2007 — Joachim Garraud vs. Depeche Mode — Enjoy the Silence
 1 May 2007 — Joachim Garraud — Street's Sound
 12 April 2007 — David Guetta feat. Chris Willis - Love Is Gone (Fred Rister & Joachim Garraud Remix)
 1 April 2007 — Lufkrawerk aka Joachim Garraud — Instruments
 1 April 2007 — Joachim Garraud — X
 10 January 2007 — Téo Moss — U Start (Joachim Garraud Remix)
 12 September 2006 — David Guetta vs. The Egg — Love Don't Let Me Go (Walking Away) (David Guetta & Joachim Garraud Fuck Me I'm Famous Mix)
 12 September 2006 — David Guetta vs. The Egg — Love Don't Let Me Go (Walking Away)
 Nick In Time — Emergency (Joachim Garraud Remix)
 30 July 2006 — Ben Blash — Destroyed
 July 2006 — Ben Blash — My Crazy Soul
 30 July 2006 — Logic (J. Garraud & D. Guetta) — Save My Soul
 30 July 2006 — Logic (J. Garraud & D. Guetta) — Fucking Swedish
 29 July 2006 — Philippe Katerine vs. Joachim Garraud — Louxor, J’adore (Space Invaders Remix)
 29 July 2006 — Joachim Garraud — Back from Space
 21 June 2006 — Joachim Garraud and Wize — I Was Alive
 20 March 2006 — Bob Sinclar — Single : World, Hold On
 26 February 2006 — David Guetta feat. Chris Willis — Single : Time
 22 December 2005 — Joachim Garraud — Compilation: ClubFG / Zemixx
 3 November 2005 — Joachim Garraud — Single : Akia
 22 October 2005 — Joachim Garraud — Single : Rock The Choice
 20 October 2005 — Skin — Single : Alone in my room
 12 October 2005 — Eurythmics — Single : I’ve Got A Life
 4 October 2005 — David Guetta feat. JD Davis — Single : In love with myself
 25 September 2005 — Benny Benassi — Single : Who's your Daddy ?
 6 September 2005 — Da Hool — Single : Meet Her at Love Parade 2005
 5 September 2005 — Joachim Garraud — Single : Space Invaders are Back
 24 June 2005 — Cerrone- Single : Supernature
 16 June 2005 — Culture Club — Single : Miss Me Blind
 23 May 2005 — Robbie Rivera — Single : Some kinds of Heaven
 23 May 2005 — Moby — Single : Beautiful
 14 April 2005 — Mylène Farmer — Single : Fuck Them All
 15 April 2005 — Joachim Garraud & Julien Creance — Single : Acid Beat
 10 March 2005 — Ralph 'n' Jo — Single : WhiteFloor / Backdraft
 9 March 2005 — Shiny Grey — Single : U made a promise
 10 February 2005 — Tim Deluxe, Bob Sinclar, David Guetta, Joachim Garraud, Ben Onono — Single : Summer Moon
 26 January 2005 — Julien Creance — Single : Heatwave
 25 January 2005 — Anaklein — Single : Lena
 24 January 2005 — Juliet — Single : Avalon
 4 January 2005 — Jan Franscisco & Joseph Armani — Single : Infactuation
 4 January 2005 — Mone — Single : Danger
 8 November 2004 — David Guetta feat JD Davis — Single : The World is Mine
 28 September 2004 — Joachim Garraud — Single : Geisterbahn
 29 August 2004 — Jean-Michel Jarre — Album : Aero
 26 August 2004 — Geyster — Single : John Clay
 15 July 2004 — Muttonheads — Single : Smashing Music
 12 July 2004 — Deep Dish — Single : Flashdance
 10 July 2004 — David Guetta feat Chris Willis — Single : Stay
 10 June 2004 — Antoine Clamaran featuring Lulu Huges — Single : Feel it
 9 June 2004 — Joachim Garraud featuring Chynna — High Energy
 8 June 2004 — David Guetta — Album : Guettablaster
 25 May 2004 — Geyster — Album : I love 1984
 8 April 2004 — David Guetta Feat Chris Willis — Single : Money
 20 February 2004 — Bob Sinclar — Single : You Could be my Lover
 28 November 2003 — Geyster — Single : It's About You
 11 August 2003 — David Guetta Feat Chris Willis — Single : Just a little more love 2003
 10 June 2003 — Kid Vicious Versus Depeche Mode — Bootleg Maxi : Kid Vicious 003
 28 May 2003 — Paul Johnson Feat Chyna — Single : Doo Wap
 21 May 2003 — Ricky Martin — Single : Jaleo
 23 April 2003 — Darren Hayes — Single : Crush
 27 March 2003 — Geyster — Single : Bye bye Superman
 13 March 2003 — Saffron Hill / Tim Deluxe — Single : Love is Always There
 3 March 2003 — Orchestral Manoeuvres in the Dark — Single : Enola Gay 2003
 24 February 2003 — David Guetta versus David Bowie — Single : Just For one Day
 21 January 2003 — David Guetta feat Barbara Tucker — Single : Give me something
 17 January 2003 — Kylie Minogue — Single : come into my world
 12 January 2003 — Kid Vicious Versus Bee Gees — Bootleg Maxi : Kid Vicious 002
 17 December 2002 — Imagination — Single : Flashback 2003
 20 November 2002 — Jean-Michel Jarre — Album : The Geometry of Love
 2 October 2002 — Cerrone — Album : Hysteria
 27 September 2002 — Kid Vicious Versus Madonna — Bootleg Maxi : Kid Vicious 001
 20 September 2002 — David Guetta feat Chris Willis — Single : People come People Go
 28 July 2002 — Cassius — Single : The Sound of Violence
 8 July 2002 — Kylie Minogue — Single : Love at first sight
 11 June 2002 — David Guetta — Album : Just a little more love.
 10 May 2002 — Antoine Clamaran — Single : Release Yourself
 5 April 2002 — David Guetta feat Chris Willis — Single : Love Don't Let Me Go
 28 May 2001 — B.T.A — Single : Batucada
 5 May 2001 — Pet Shop Boys — Single : Break 4 Luv
 28 January 2001 — David Guetta Feat Chris Willis — Single : Just a little more love
 3 January 2000 — Jean-Michel Jarre — Album : Metamorphoses.

Studio albums 
 96/24 (2016)
 Invasion 2011 (2011)
 Invasion (2008)

References

External links
Joachim Garraud's Official Website
Joachim Garraud Instagram
Joachim Garraud Facebook
Joachim Garraud Twitter
Joachim Garraud 2009 interview Laptoprockers
 Long exclusive interview of Joachim Garraud with data from the beginnings to Inox Park 

Musicians from Nantes
French DJs
Ableton Live users
1968 births
Living people
Electro house musicians
Electronic dance music DJs